Nikolai Dimitrovich Avksentyev (28 November 1878, Penza – 24 March 1943, New York City) was a leading member of the  Socialist-Revolutionary Party (PSR). He was one of the 'Heidelberg SRs' (a group of Russian students at the University of Heidelberg in the 1890s), like Vladimir Zenzinov. These SRs were influenced by neo-Kantian philosophy and Marxism. As Chairman of the Provisional All-Russian Government, he headed the Russian state from September 23 to November 18, 1918. He was overthrown and arrested by the Minister of War, Alexander Kolchak, who proclaimed himself the Supreme ruler of Russia.

Biography

Born into the Russian nobility, Nikolai Avksentiev attended school in Penza, studied at the Law Faculty of Moscow University (in 1899 he was expelled due to student unrest). He was a founder and the first chairman of the Party of Socialist Revolutionaries, and during the 1905 Russian revolution was elected to the Saint Petersburg Soviet. Together with other leading figures of the Soviet, he was arrested. In the fall of 1906 he appeared at an open trial, where he defended the position of his party. Like all the main accused, he was convicted and exiled to Obdorsk in Siberia, he escaped abroad in 1907. In Germany, at the University of Heidelberg, he wrote a doctrinal thesis on Friedrich Neitszche's concept of the 'Superman'. In exile, he edited the Socialist-Revolutionary newspaper "The Banner of Labor". He was the leader of the right-wing of the Socialist Revolutionaries, a supporter of legal forms of struggle with the imperialist regime and opposed to the terrorist tactics of the Left SRs. During the First World War Avksentiev was associated with the 'Defencist' wing of the PSR and collaborated closely with Vadim Rudnev, Avram Gots and others. He was an active member of the irregular freemasonic lodge, the Grand Orient of Russia’s Peoples.

After the February Revolution, he was elected a member of the Petrograd Soviet, chairman of the All-Russian Central Executive Committee, Minister of the Interior of the second coalition Provisional Government, chaired the All-Russian Democratic Conference and was elected to the Provisional Council of the Russian Republic. He was elected to the All-Russian Constituent Assembly from Penza.

After the October Revolution, he was one of the organizers of the Committee for the Salvation of the Homeland and Revolution, for which he was imprisoned in the Peter and Paul Fortress by the new Bolshevik government. As I.I. Manukhin wrote in his memoirs, Avksentiev was released from the Krestov hospital thanks to the intervention of the People's Commissar of Justice, Socialist Revolutionary Isaac Steinberg.

In March 1918, he became a leader of the Russian Revival Union. By a decision of the SR Central Committee, he left at the end of May for Siberia, which was considered by the Socialist-Revolutionaries as a potential base of resistance to the Bolshevik regime. In September 1918, he was elected chairman of the State Meeting in Ufa and headed the new Provisional All-Russian Government, which united the fragmented anti-Bolshevik governments of eastern Russia. On November 18, Alexander Kolchak launched a coup d'etat that dissolved the provisional government and established a military dictatorship in its place. Avksentiev was briefly arrested by Kolchak's forces and fled Russia via Vladivostok, with the assistance of the British military. He settled in Paris and was active in émigré circles and in Freemasonry. After the Nazi invasion of France, Avksentiev and his wife Berthe escaped to the United States, with an emergency visa provided by the Jewish Labor Committee and the American Federation of Labor, where he published the magazine "For Freedom". Avksentiev died on March 4, 1943, in New York City.

His daughter, Alexandra became an accomplished painter.

References

1878 births
1943 deaths
People from Penza
People from Penzensky Uyezd
Socialist Revolutionary Party politicians
Ministers of the Russian Provisional Government
Russian Constituent Assembly members
People of the Russian Revolution
Members of the Grand Orient of Russia's Peoples
Russian revolutionaries
Expatriates from the Russian Empire in Germany